Andrews ministry may refer to the below three ministries led by Victorian Premier Daniel Andrews:

First Andrews ministry, December 2014 to November 2018
Second Andrews ministry, November 2018 to December 2022
Third Andrews ministry, December 2022 to date